Pavangad is a suburb included in Kozhikode corporation in the Kozhikode district of Kerala, India. It is located about 6.5 km north of Calicut on the Calicut-Kannur National Highway 66 (India) and is bounded by the Arabian Sea at the west, Canoli Canal at east and Korapuzha River at the north. State Highway 54 (Kerala) starts from Pavangad and ends in Kalpetta. 
Late Mr. K. T. Muhammed was a resident in Pavangad, popularly known as KT, was a Malayalam playwright and screenwriter. He died on 25 March 2008 at his residence.
Pavangad is a fast-growing residential area towards the northern city limits of Kozhikode. Sneha Residence association is one of the major residential associations in this locality which consists of around 237 houses.

Puthiyappa
Puthiyappa is an important fishing harbour of Kozhikode district within the city limits. Pavangad is 500m away from the harbour site. There is a natural bay at Puthiyappa formed due to the protrusion of land into the sea.

Transportation
Pavangad is well connected with both road and rail networks. There are public and private transports that run in these roads. NH 66(Old NH 17) and SH 54 are the important roads passing through pavangad. National Highway 66 connects Kozhikode to Mumbai via Mangalore, Udupi and Goa to the north and Kochi and Kanyakumari near Thiruvananthapuram to the south along the west coast of India. This highway connects the city with the other important towns like Uppala, Kasaragod, Kanhangad, Kannur, Thalassery, Mahe, Vadakara, Koyilandy, Vengalam, Ramanattukara, Kottakkal, Kuttippuram, Ponnani, (Guruvayoor) Chavakkad, Kodungallur, North Paravur, Edapally and proceed to Kanyakumari.SH 54 is connecting city and Kalpetta. The highway is 99.0 kilometres (61.5 mi) long. The highway passes through Pavangad, Kozhikode, Ulliyeri, Perambra, Poozhithodu, Peruvannamuzhi and Padinjarethara.

Automobile showrooms

 Audi
 Volkswagen
 Harley Davidson
 Jawa Motorcycles
 Hyundai
 Nissan
 Eicher
 Royal Enfield
 skoda
 Nexa
 Maruti Suzuki ARENA

Professional Courier Puthiyangadi
 Puthiyappa Harbour
 KSEB Sub station
 Darussalam Masjidh
 M.E.S. Indian school
 Malabar College
 Victoria College
 Puthur Durga Devi Temple
 Puthur UP School
 State Bank of India 
 Movanari Temple
 Kozhikode KSRTC Depot
 Puthiyappa Temple
 Radio Mango (First Private Radio Station in Kerala)
 chinadath Juma Masjidh

Location

References 

Suburbs of Kozhikode
Kozhikode downtown